Anne-Marie Sicotte (born 1962) is a writer in Quebec, Canada.

The daughter of Sylvie Gélinas, she was born in Montreal. Her maternal grandfather was Gratien Gélinas. Sicotte received a bachelor's degree in history and anthropology. She was editor in chief for L'Éclusier, a monthly publication dealing with the history of the Lachine Canal. She published De la vapeur au vélo : le guide du canal de Lachine for Parks Canada in 1986. She then worked as journalist and editor for various publications. From 1995 to 1996, she published a two-volume biography of her grandfather Gratien Gélinas - la ferveur et le doute. In 2005, she published Marie-Gérin Lajoie, Conquérante de la liberté.

In 1992, she won first prize in the annual contest sponsored by Voir magazine for her contribution to the collection of stories Circonstances particulières.

Selected works 
 Gratien Gélinas : du naïf Fridolin à l'ombrageux Tit-Coq, biography (2001)
 Justice Lacoste Beaubien. Au secours des enfants malades, biography (2002)
 Les accoucheuses, trilogy (2006-2008)
 Le pays insoumis, novel (2011)
 Les tuques bleues, novel (2014)
 Histoire inédite des patriotes. Un peuple libre en images, history (2016)

References

External links 
 Fonds Anne-Marie Sicotte (R(8988) at Library and Archives Canada 

1962 births
Living people
Writers from Montreal
Canadian biographers
Canadian historical novelists